Stig Penne is a Norwegian handball player.

He made his debut on the Norwegian national team in 1996, 
and played 80 matches for the national team between 1996 and 2002. He competed at the 1999 and 2001 World Men's Handball Championship.

References

Year of birth missing (living people)
Living people
Norwegian male handball players